Echinocereus enneacanthus is  a species of flowering plant first described by George Engelmann.

Subspecies 
This species is divided into the following subspecies:

 Echinocereus enneacanthus brevispinus
 Echinocereus enneacanthus enneacanthus

References 

enneacanthus